Habanera is an album by the English classical saxophonist John Harle and the pianist John Lenehan. Produced by Joe Boyd and released on his Hannibal world music record label in 1987, the recording features an eclectic range of composers and musical genres.

Reception
Allmusic awarded the album with 3 stars.

Track listing

Personnel
John Harle – soprano and alto saxophones  
John Lenehan – piano
Nick Parker – engineer

References

1987 debut albums
1980s classical albums
Albums produced by Joe Boyd
Hannibal Records albums